The Ambeno was a traditional kingship on the north coast of Timor, among the Atoni people. Its area is now in the Oecusse district (former Oecussi-Ambeno) of East Timor. The capital was in Nunheno until 1912, then in Tulaica.

References
 

History of East Timor
Oecusse